Paulson is a locality in Manitoba, Canada.

Paulson lies within the Rural Municipality of Dauphin.

Royal Canadian Air Force
RCAF Station Paulson was the site of British Commonwealth Air Training Plan No. 7 Bombing & Gunnery School  during World War II.

References

Localities in Manitoba
Paulson